Francis Dickinson may refer to:

 Francis Dickinson (1632–1704), soldier who participated in the English invasion of Jamaica in 1655
 Francis Dickinson (politician) (1813–1890), English Conservative Member of Parliament (MP) for West Somerset 1841–1847
 Francis Dickinson (1830–1898), soldier in the Charge of the Light Brigade, buried at Sheffield General Cemetery